Cossacks is a sculpture composition on the north-west outskirts of Volgodonsk, Rostov oblast, Russia. It decorates the lock № 15 of Volga–Don Shipping Canal. The sculpture composition was opened in 1953. It was designed by sculptor Georgy Motovilov and architect Leonid Polyakov. By resolution of the Council of Ministers of the Russian Soviet Federative Socialist Republic of August 30, 1960 № 1327, the monument was designated a federal Heritage Site. It is the only object of federal cultural heritage in Volgodonsk and Volgodonskoy District. Cossacks sculptures symbolize the military glory of the Don Cossacks as a whole and the feat of the 4th Guards Kuban Cossack Cavalry Corps during the Great Patriotic War.

Description 
The sculpture composition consists of two towers-columns located on both sides of the last lock (№ 15) of Volga–Don Shipping Canal. Massive pedestals are  topped with bronze statues of horsemen. The pedestals are designed in the style of early classicism. They are decorated with fielded panel. The monument is 9 m height; width is 4.5 m at the base.

The Cossacks in uniform represented as a prancing horsemen. One of them threatens with a shashka. Other keeps it above the head. Economic or some other activities that can undermine preservation of the monument is prohibited on the immediate area because that this sculpture composition is object of cultural heritage. Also advertisement placement and deforestation are prohibited.

Gallery

References 

Monuments and memorials built in the Soviet Union
Outdoor sculptures in Russia
1953 sculptures
Statues in Russia
Bronze sculptures in Russia
Tourist attractions in Rostov Oblast
Equestrian statues in Russia
World War II memorials in Russia
Works about Cossacks
Monuments and memorials in Rostov Oblast
Cultural heritage monuments of federal significance in Rostov Oblast